The Bruckner Expressway is a freeway in the borough of the Bronx in New York City. It carries Interstate 278 (I-278) and I-95 (and formerly I-878) from the Triborough Bridge to the south end of the New England Thruway at the Pelham Parkway interchange. The highway follows a mostly northeast–southwest alignment through the southern portion of the borough, loosely paralleling the course of the East River. It connects to several major freeways including the Bronx River Parkway, and at the Bruckner Interchange, it connects to the Cross Bronx Expressway, the Whitestone Expressway, and the Hutchinson River Parkway.

Route description

The expressway begins at the northern approach to the Triborough Bridge, where I-278 meets the southern end of I-87, here known as the Major Deegan Expressway. It heads to the northeast as an elevated highway, carrying the I-278 designation through the South Bronx. After , the Bruckner Expressway meets NY 895 (Sheridan Boulevard) and turns eastward to cross the Bronx River into the Soundview neighborhood. Here, the highway connects to the Bronx River Parkway at an interchange one block north of that road's official southern terminus. The Bruckner Expressway remains I-278 into the adjacent neighborhood of Castle Hill, where I-278 enters the west half of the complicated Bruckner Interchange and I-95 transitions from the Cross Bronx Expressway to the Bruckner.

In the east half of the junction, located on the opposite bank of Westchester Creek in Throggs Neck, the Bruckner Expressway (now designated I-95) intersects the Hutchinson River Parkway, I-295, and I-678. I-295 proceeds southeast from the Bruckner Interchange as the Cross Bronx Expressway Extension, while the Hutchinson Parkway and I-678 head to the north and south, respectively. The Bruckner eventually makes a turn to the north as well, connecting with I-695 in the process. The Hutchinson and the Bruckner follow mostly parallel alignments to Pelham Bay Park, where the Bruckner Expressway ends at an interchange with the Pelham Parkway. I-95 continues north from this point as the New England Thruway.

History
The Bruckner Expressway was a project envisioned by Robert Moses, who steered the Bruckner through the Soundview section of the Bronx, further altering the neighborhood after the 15-year construction of the Cross Bronx Expressway, which was completed in 1963. The Bruckner Expressway itself was completed in 1973, making it one of the last roads of the New York City Expressway system to be built.  It is named in honor of former Bronx Borough President and Congressman, Henry Bruckner (1871–1942), and was built on and over the roadway of Bruckner Boulevard (Originally called Eastern Boulevard). 

Unlike the Cross Bronx Expressway, which cut through the existing street grid, the Bruckner Expressway was built along the Bruckner Boulevard alignment (except at its western end, where the Bruckner Expressway and Major Deegan Expressway meet). Between Sheridan Boulevard and the eastern end of the Bruckner Expressway, the Bruckner Boulevard is the service road, except at the Bruckner Interchange, where Bruckner Boulevard passes underneath the flying junction.

In 2019, the New York State Department of Transportation began a $1.1 billion project to rebuild parts of the Bruckner Expressway and improve traffic flow, which would reduce air and noise pollution. The project would rebuild the interchanges with both Sheridan Boulevard and Hunts Point Avenue, add a third lane in both directions of the Bruckner, and rebuild four bridges.

Exit list

References

Transportation in the Bronx
Expressways in New York City
Robert Moses projects
Interstate 95
Interstate 78